Tom and Jerry: A Nutcracker Tale is a 2007 American direct-to-video animated Christmas fantasy comedy film. The film was produced by Warner Bros. Animation and Turner Entertainment Co., and is the first Tom and Jerry film directed by Spike Brandt and Tony Cervone. It serves as the fifth direct-to-video Tom and Jerry film and is a semi-adaptation of 1816 short story "The Nutcracker and the Mouse King" by E. T. A. Hoffmann, with Jerry in the role of the Nutcracker and Tom in the role of one of the Mouse King's (who is reimagined as a cat) henchmen.

Aside from being the last Tom and Jerry film to be filmed in a 1:33:1 Full-Screen format, A Nutcracker Tale was the last animated production that Joseph Barbera worked on before his death on December 18, 2006, and as such, the film is now dedicated to his memory. This was also the last animated direct-to-video film released under the Warner Bros. Family Entertainment label before Warner Bros. ceased using the brand's name altogether in 2009.

On August 13, 2020, it was announced that the film would be released on Blu-ray and special edition DVD, and paired with Tom and Jerry: Santa's Little Helpers. The bundle was released on October 27, 2020.

Plot 
After watching The Nutcracker, Jerry and his ward Tuffy find themselves pulled into the story by a magic miracle. The stage transforms into a wintry wonderland where the toys all enjoy a dinner feast. However, the magic also affects Tom and the other cats, led by the King of the Cats, who ruin the feast and trap the toys while Jerry, a decoration named Paulie the pixie, and a toy horse named Nelly, who can only speak when someone pulls her string, try to stop them, but end up shot out of a cannon and blasted far away. Tom traps a Ballerina toy in a cage and brings her to the King of the cats as a trophy. When the King of the Cats learns that Jerry will not give up until the kingdom is reclaimed, he has Tom form a posse to destroy him. At the Ballerina Toy's urging, Tuffy secretly follows the cats to warn Jerry. Jerry, Tuffy, and their new friends decide to follow a star to meet the Toy Maker, the person who created the toys, and seek his aid. Tom chases them through several magical realms and during the journey Nelly is captured by the cats and is forced to tell them where the others are headed, leaving her discouraged at her betrayal. The remaining three make it to the Toy Maker and he fixes Paulie, who suffered damage during the journey, a makes him a real toy. The Toy Maker warns that if Jerry cannot reclaim his kingdom before the sun fully rises in the morning, the cats will control of the kingdom forever and he gives them a key that allows them to awaken an army of toy soldiers. The three depart with their new army to take back the kingdom. When the cats attempt to escape the army of toy soldiers, the Ballerina frees herself and the other toys from captivity and leads them in an army against the Cat King. When Tom traps Jerry and Tuffy in his mouth, Nelly returns and breaks them out. Jerry chases the cats out of the kingdom and back to the real world just before the sun finishes rising. However, a wall damaged by the battle collapses, and Nelly sacrifices herself to push Jerry and the Ballerina Toy out of the way. The magic miracle returns and restores Nelly, and allows her to speak without her string. The events of the story are revealed to be a play witnessed by the Ballerina from the Nutcracker and the Toymaker.

Voice cast 
 Spike Brandt (uncredited) and William Hanna (archived sound effects, uncredited) as Tom Cat and Jerry Mouse
 Tony Cervone as Butch Cat
 Chantal Strand as Tuffy
 Ian James Corlett as Paulie
 Kathleen Barr as Nelly
 Tara Strong as La Petite Ballerina
 Garry Chalk as King of the Cats
 Trevor Devall as Lackey
 Richard Newman as The Toymaker
 Mark Oliver as Dr. Malevolent

Production 
According to Brandt, Joseph Barbera decided on a Nutcracker adaptation as he thought its music fit perfectly with Tom and Jerry. The Amazon page for the DVD appeared sometime in August 2007.

Widescreen 

Tom and Jerry: A Nutcracker Tale was the fourth Tom and Jerry film to be filmed in high-definition widescreen (the first three being Tom and Jerry: Blast Off to Mars, Tom and Jerry: The Fast and the Furry and Tom and Jerry: Shiver Me Whiskers), although the Region 1 DVD and the U.S. version of Boomerang were in full screen (cropping the left and right of the image). The film is broadcast in widescreen on Cartoon Network in the United States, as well as a Blu-ray version.

Reception 
Paul Mavis of DVD Talk gave the film a very positive review saying "Tom and Jerry: A Nutcracker Tale earns marks for embracing an operatic storyline while keeping the essential punish-Tom-with-pain gags that made Tom and Jerry such a successful franchise for decades." Meanwhile, Nick Lyons criticized it, stating "Tom And Jerry: A Nutcracker Tale is a rushed animated feature that was simply made to cash in on the Christmas holiday. Avoid this one and rent or buy a holiday classic like the animated Grinch."

Renee Schonfeld of Common Sense Media rated the film 4 out of 5 stars (making it the highest rated Tom and Jerry film on the site) saying "especially at holiday time, for kids who understand cartoon action, it's a delightful entertainment. Teens and grown-ups might like it, too."

See also
 List of Christmas films

References

External links 
 

2007 films
2007 animated films
2007 direct-to-video films
2000s Christmas films
2000s adventure comedy films
2000s fantasy comedy films
2000s American animated films
2000s children's animated films
American direct-to-video films
American Christmas films
American fantasy comedy films
American adventure comedy films
American children's animated adventure films
American children's animated comedy films
American children's animated fantasy films
Animated Christmas films
Animated adventure films
Films directed by Spike Brandt
Films directed by Tony Cervone
Films based on The Nutcracker and the Mouse King
Films set in 2007
Films set in New York City
Tom and Jerry films
Warner Bros. Animation animated films
Warner Bros. direct-to-video animated films
2007 comedy films
2000s English-language films